Spring 1990 (The Other One) is a live album by the rock band the Grateful Dead.  Packaged as a box set, it contains eight complete concerts on 23 CDs, recorded during the band's spring 1990 concert tour. It was produced as a limited edition of 9,000 numbered copies, and was released by Rhino Records on September 9, 2014. In addition to the music CDs, the box set includes a 144-page paperback book, three art prints, and replica tickets stubs and backstage passes from all eight shows.

Spring 1990 (The Other One) is a follow-up to the Spring 1990 box set, released in 2012, which contained six other concerts from the same tour, on 18 CDs. Between those two box sets and the albums Dozin' at the Knick, Postcards of the Hanging, Without a Net and Terrapin Station (Limited Edition), the entire spring 1990 concert tour has been officially released. This is the second complete tour by the band to be released officially (following Europe 72: The Complete Recordings and preceding July 1978: The Complete Recordings), though several venue runs have also been released, as well as the middle of the May 1977 tour (released in 2013 as live album May 1977).

One of the concerts included in Spring 1990 (The Other One) – the one recorded on March 29, 1990 at Nassau Coliseum, with Branford Marsalis sitting in on saxophone for much of the show – was also released separately on September 9, 2014, as the album Wake Up to Find Out.

Spring 1990 (The Other One) was nominated for a Grammy Award for Best Boxed or Special Limited Edition Package.

Concerts
Spring 1990 (The Other One) contains the following complete concerts:
March 14, 1990 – Capital Centre, Landover, Maryland
March 18, 1990 – Hartford Civic Center, Hartford, Connecticut
March 21, 1990 – Copps Coliseum, Hamilton, Ontario
March 25, 1990 – Knickerbocker Arena, Albany, New York
March 28, 1990 – Nassau Coliseum, Uniondale, New York
March 29, 1990 – Nassau Coliseum, Uniondale, New York
April 1, 1990 – The Omni, Atlanta
April 3, 1990 – The Omni, Atlanta, Georgia

Personnel
Grateful Dead
Jerry Garcia – guitar, vocals
Mickey Hart – drums
Bill Kreutzmann – drums
Phil Lesh – electric bass, vocals
Brent Mydland – keyboards, vocals
Bob Weir – guitar, vocals
Additional musicians
Branford Marsalis – saxophone at the March 29 concert
Production
Produced by Grateful Dead
Produced for release by David Lemieux
Recording: John Cutler
Mixing: Jeffrey Norman
Mastering: David Glasser
Artwork: Jessica Dessner

Track listing

March 14, 1990 – Capital Centre, Landover, Maryland
Disc 1
First set:
"Cold Rain and Snow" (traditional, arranged by Grateful Dead) – 6:56
"Feel Like a Stranger" (Bob Weir, John Barlow)  – 7:44
"Never Trust a Woman" (Brent Mydland) – 6:27
"Mama Tried" > (Merle Haggard) – 2:31
"Big River" (Johnny Cash)  – 5:21
"Loose Lucy" (Jerry Garcia, Robert Hunter) – 6:56
"Stuck Inside of Mobile with the Memphis Blues Again" (Bob Dylan) – 8:50
"Row Jimmy" (Garcia, Hunter) – 10:17
"Let It Grow" (Weir, Barlow) – 11:54
Disc 2
Second set:
"Crazy Fingers" > (Garcia, Hunter) – 8:12
"Playing in the Band" > (Weir, Mickey Hart, Hunter) – 10:27
"Uncle John's Band" > (Garcia, Hunter) – 8:05
"Jam" > (Grateful Dead) – 7:12
"Drums" > (Hart, Bill Kreutzmann) – 7:38
"Space" > (Garcia, Phil Lesh, Mydland, Weir) – 6:34
"Dear Mr. Fantasy" > (Steve Winwood, Chris Wood, Jim Capaldi) – 5:53
"I Need a Miracle" > (Weir, Barlow) – 4:07
"Black Peter" > (Garcia, Hunter) – 7:53
"Turn On Your Lovelight" (Joseph Scott, Deadric Malone) – 6:01
Encore:
"Black Muddy River" (Garcia, Hunter) – 6:00
Note

First "Loose Lucy" since Oct. 19, 1974

March 18, 1990 – Hartford Civic Center, Hartford, Connecticut
Disc 1
First set:
"Shakedown Street" > (Garcia, Hunter) – 12:45
"Little Red Rooster" (Willie Dixon) – 9:28
"Stagger Lee" (Garcia, Hunter) – 5:29
"Me and My Uncle" > (John Phillips) – 3:08
"Mexicali Blues" (Weir, Barlow) – 5:22
"Friend of the Devil" (Garcia, John Dawson, Hunter) – 8:44
"Just a Little Light" (Mydland, Barlow) – 5:55
"When I Paint My Masterpiece" (Dylan) – 5:32
"Ramble On Rose" (Garcia, Hunter) – 8:02
"The Music Never Stopped" (Weir, Barlow) – 7:38
Disc 2
Second set:
"Iko Iko" (James Crawford) – 8:08
"Looks Like Rain" (Weir, Barlow) – 8:27
"He's Gone" > (Garcia, Hunter) – 8:56
"Truckin'" > (Garcia, Lesh, Weir, Hunter) – 8:54
"Spoonful" > (Dixon) – 7:19
"Drums" > (Hart, Kreutzmann) – 6:52
Disc 3
"Space" > (Garcia, Lesh, Mydland, Weir) – 11:23
"The Wheel" > (Garcia, Hunter) – 5:49
"All Along the Watchtower" > (Dylan) – 6:06
"Morning Dew" (Bonnie Dobson, Tim Rose) – 11:32
Encore:
"U.S. Blues" (Garcia, Hunter) – 5:31

March 21, 1990 – Copps Coliseum, Hamilton, Ontario
Disc 1
First set:
"Mississippi Half-Step Uptown Toodeloo" (Garcia, Hunter) – 8:33
"New Minglewood Blues" (traditional, arranged by Grateful Dead) – 7:36
"Far From Me" (Mydland) – 5:05
"Queen Jane Approximately" (Dylan) – 6:29
"Loose Lucy" (Garcia, Hunter) – 7:27
"Victim or the Crime" > (Weir, Gerrit Graham) – 8:07
"Standing on the Moon" > (Garcia, Hunter) – 8:00
"Promised Land" (Chuck Berry) – 4:53
Disc 2
Second set:
"Hey Pocky Way" (Joseph Modeliste, Art Neville, Leo Nocentelli, George Porter Jr.) – 7:10
"Crazy Fingers" > (Garcia, Hunter) – 07:38
"Cumberland Blues" (Garcia, Lesh, Hunter) – 5:30
"Estimated Prophet" > (Weir, Barlow) – 11:51
"He's Gone" > (Garcia, Hunter) – 12:42
"Drums" > (Hart, Kreutzmann) – 9:37
Disc 3
"Space" > (Garcia, Lesh, Mydland, Weir) – 7:39
"I Need a Miracle" >  (Weir, Barlow) – 4:16
"Wharf Rat" > (Garcia, Hunter) – 8:41
"Throwing Stones" > (Weir, Barlow) – 8:59
"Turn On Your Lovelight" (Scott, Malone) – 6:51
Encore:
"Knockin' on Heaven's Door" (Dylan) – 7:10
Note

March 25, 1990 – Knickerbocker Arena, Albany, New York
Disc 1
First set:
"Greatest Story Ever Told" > (Weir, Hart, Hunter) – 4:06
"Touch of Grey" (Garcia, Hunter) – 6:42
"Wang Dang Doodle" (Dixon) – 7:22
"Never Trust a Woman" (Mydland) – 7:36
"Jack-a-Roe" (traditional, arranged by Grateful Dead) – 4:36
"When I Paint My Masterpiece" (Dylan) – 5:27
"Bird Song" (Garcia, Hunter) – 13:08
"Let It Grow" (Weir, Barlow) – 11:36
Disc 2
Second set:
"Eyes of the World" > (Garcia, Hunter) – 13:26
"Samson and Delilah" (traditional, arranged by Grateful Dead) – 7:47
"Crazy Fingers" > (Garcia, Hunter) – 7:21
"Truckin'" > (Garcia, Lesh, Weir, Hunter) – 7:43
"Spoonful" > (Dixon) – 5:37
"Drums" > (Hart, Kreutzmann) – 9:59
Disc 3
"Space" > (Garcia, Lesh, Mydland, Weir) – 8:58
"I Will Take You Home" > (Mydland) – 4:18
"Goin' Down the Road Feeling Bad" > (traditional, arranged by Grateful Dead) – 6:58
"Black Peter" > (Garcia, Hunter) – 9:09
"Around and Around" (Berry) – 6:45
Encore:
"Quinn The Eskimo" (Dylan) – 4:40
Notes

March 28, 1990 – Nassau Coliseum, Uniondale, New York
Disc 1
First set:
"Cold Rain and Snow" >  (traditional, arranged by Grateful Dead) – 6:29
"New Minglewood Blues" (traditional, arranged by Grateful Dead) – 7:27
"Easy to Love You" (Mydland) – 5:48
"High Time" (Garcia, Hunter) – 6:14
"Queen Jane Approximately" (Dylan) – 6:32
"Loose Lucy" (Garcia, Hunter) – 6:11
"Cassidy" > (Weir, Barlow) – 6:06
"Deal" (Garcia, Hunter) – 8:18
Disc 2
Second set:
"Foolish Heart" > (Garcia, Hunter) – 10:21
"Looks Like Rain" > (Weir, Barlow) – 8:09
"Cumberland Blues" > (Garcia, Lesh, Hunter) – 5:50
"The Weight" (Robbie Robertson) – 5:46
"Hey Pocky Way" > (Modeliste, Neville, Nocentelli, Porter) – 7:04
"Drums" > (Hart, Kreutzmann) – 11:17
Disc 3
"Space" > (Garcia, Lesh, Mydland, Weir) – 9:22
"The Other One" > (Weir, Kreutzmann) – 6:52
"Wharf Rat" > (Garcia, Hunter) – 10:35
"Good Lovin'" (Rudy Clark, Artie Resnick) – 7:52
Encore:
"Revolution" (John Lennon, Paul McCartney) – 4:55
Notes

March 29, 1990 – Nassau Coliseum, Uniondale, New York
Disc 1
First set:
"Jack Straw" > (Weir, Hunter) – 6:15
"Bertha" (Garcia, Hunter) – 6:59
"We Can Run" (Mydland, Barlow) – 6:04
"Ramble On Rose" (Garcia, Hunter) – 8:08
"When I Paint My Masterpiece" (Dylan) – 6:02
"Bird Song" > (Garcia, Hunter) – 13:05
"Promised Land" (Berry) – 4:46
Disc 2
Second set:
"Eyes of the World" > (Garcia, Hunter) – 16:33
"Estimated Prophet" > (Weir, Barlow) – 14:47
"Dark Star" > (Garcia, Hart, Kreutzmann, Lesh, Ron McKernan, Weir, Hunter) – 18:19
"Drums" > (Hart, Kreutzmann) – 10:22
Disc 3
"Space" > (Garcia, Lesh, Mydland, Weir) – 7:53
"Dark Star" > (Garcia, Hart, Kreutzmann, Lesh, McKernan, Weir, Hunter) – 2:46
"The Wheel" > (Garcia, Hunter) – 4:23
"Throwing Stones" > (Weir, Barlow) – 9:25
"Turn On Your Lovelight" (Scott, Malone) – 7:41
Encore:
"Knockin' on Heaven's Door" (Dylan) – 8:24
Notes

April 1, 1990 – The Omni, Atlanta, Georgia
Disc 1
First set:
"Touch of Grey" (Garcia, Hunter) – 6:41
"Walkin' Blues" (Robert Johnson, arranged by Weir) – 6:27
"Just a Little Light" (Mydland) – 6:12
"Candyman" (Garcia, Hunter) – 7:20
"Me and My Uncle" > (Phillips) – 3:05
"Big River" (Cash) – 5:28
"Althea" (Garcia, Hunter) – 8:09
"Victim or the Crime" > (Weir, Graham) – 9:55
"To Lay Me Down" > (Garcia, Hunter) – 9:24
"The Music Never Stopped" (Weir, Barlow) – 7:55
Disc 2
Second set:
"China Cat Sunflower" > (Garcia, Hunter) – 5:33
"I Know You Rider" (traditional, arranged by Grateful Dead) – 4:51
"Ship of Fools" > (Garcia, Hunter) – 7:50
"Man Smart, Woman Smarter" > (Norman Span) – 7:54
"Drums" > (Hart, Kreutzmann) – 7:30
Disc 3
"Space" > (Garcia, Lesh, Mydland, Weir) – 11:48
"Dear Mr. Fantasy" > (Winwood, Wood, Capaldi) – 5:42
"Hey Jude" > (Lennon, McCartney) – 2:37
"Truckin'" > (Garcia, Lesh, Weir, Hunter) – 7:00
"Stella Blue" > (Garcia, Hunter) – 10:21
"Sugar Magnolia" (Weir, Hunter) – 9:15
Encore:
"It's All Over Now, Baby Blue" (Dylan) – 7:40
Notes

April 3, 1990 – The Omni, Atlanta, Georgia
Disc 1
First set:
"Shakedown Street" (Garcia, Hunter) – 12:15
"Hell in a Bucket" > (Weir, Mydland, Barlow) – 6:17
"Sugaree" (Garcia, Hunter) – 11:24
"We Can Run" (Mydland, Barlow) – 6:55
"When I Paint My Masterpiece" (Dylan) – 5:17
"Row Jimmy" (Garcia) – 10:11
"Picasso Moon" (Weir, Bralove, Barlow) – 7:14
"Tennessee Jed" > (Garcia, Hunter) – 7:39
"Promised Land" (Berry) – 4:42
Disc 2
Second set:
"Estimated Prophet" > (Weir, Barlow) – 14:03
"Scarlet Begonias" > (Garcia, Hunter) – 6:57
"Crazy Fingers" > (Garcia, Hunter) – 8:06
"Playing in the Band" > (Weir, Hart, Hunter) – 11:40
"Drums" > (Hart, Kreutzmann) – 8:17
Disc 3
"Space" > (Garcia, Lesh, Mydland, Weir) – 6:56
"I Will Take You Home" > (Mydland) – 4:17
"Goin' Down the Road Feeling Bad" > (traditional, arranged by Grateful Dead) – 6:14
"Throwing Stones" > (Weir, Barlow) – 8:42
"Not Fade Away" (Norman Petty, Charles Hardin) – 7:27
Encore:
"We Bid You Goodnight" (traditional, arranged by Grateful Dead) – 3:14

References

Grateful Dead live albums
2014 live albums
Rhino Entertainment live albums